Sabang (Jawoë: سابڠ) is a city in Aceh province, Indonesia consisting of Weh Island and several smaller islands off the northern tip of Sumatra. Sabang is known as the northernmost and westernmost city of Indonesia. It also has by far the smallest population of any city in Indonesia.

History 

According to local mythology, the island of Weh was once connected to the mainland Sumatra. The island of Weh has been described as far as Ptolemy in 301 BC and was mentioned as "Golden Island". During early 11th and 12th centuries, the island was often visited by Arab and Indian traders who called the island "Shabag", which arguably was the origin of the city name. The settlement on the island was called by Acehnese "Ulee Iheuh", which means "place for crossing". During the time of Aceh Sultanate, the island was used as a place for exiles by the sultanate.

Before the Suez Canal was opened in 1869, the Indonesian archipelago was reached via the Sunda Strait from Africa. From the Suez Canal, the route to Indonesia is shorter via the Malacca Strait. Due to its natural harbour with relatively deep and well sheltered water, the Dutch East Indies government decided to open Sabang as a quay. It changed hands to Dutch East Indies and later was operated as port and open for foreign ships in 1883 under management of "Asosiasi Atjeh" (Aceh Association). In 1883, Sabang quay was opened for ships to dock by the Atjeh Associate. At first, the harbour was intended as a coal station for the Dutch navy, but later also served merchant vessels and for the transfer of export goods from northern Sumatra. The port was expanded on 1887 and opened again as free port in 1895 under Sabang Maatschaappij. In 1899, Asosiasi Ajteh was incorporated and became N.V. Zeehaven en Kolenstation Sabang te Batavia. The Japanese occupied the island in 1942 and installed numerous bunkers, fortifications, and gun emplacements . Their remnants can still be seen, though most have been re-purposed or removed. On 19 April 1944, the Japanese facilities were attacked by a combined Allied naval force in Operation Cockpit.

Sabang again became a free port under Indonesia in 1963 and gained city status in 1965. In 2000, Sabang was declared a free trade zone and as a result saw a rapid growth in shipping and trade. However, this boom stopped in 2004 due to Aceh having been declared as a military operation area, and also due to the 2004 Indian Ocean earthquake and tsunami. Unlike mainland Aceh where a mass exodus occurred, Sabang itself was much less affected by the military conflict and saw little tension between Acehnese and non-Acehnese.

Geography 

Sabang is the Indonesia's northernmost administrative region, directly borders with neighboring countries like Malaysia, Thailand, and India. It is surrounded by Malacca Strait in its north and east and the Indian Ocean in its south and west.

Sabang city area covers five main islands. The largest of them is Weh Island, where the city center is located. Other islands are Klah Island, Rondo Island (the northernmost island in Indonesia), Rubiah Island, and Seulako Island. There is a freshwater lake in Weh Island called Aneuk Laot Lake.

Climate
Sabang has a tropical rainforest climate (Af) with moderate rainfall from February to August and heavy rainfall from September to January.

Governance

Administrative districts 
The city is divided into two districts (kecamatan), listed below with their areas and their populations at the 2010 census and the 2020 census, together with the official estimates as at mid 2021.

Local government 
As with all Indonesian cities, the local government is a second-level administrative division run by a mayor and vice mayor, together with the city parliament, and it is equivalent to a regency. Executive power lies in the mayor and vice mayor, while legislation duties are carried out by the local parliament. Mayor, vice mayor, and parliament members are democratically elected by the people of the city. Meanwhile, head of districts are appointed directly by the city mayor on the recommendation of the city secretary.

Economy 
Economic activities in the city are diverse. As of 2021, the largest economic sector in the city was construction with contribution to city's gross regional product of 33.78%, followed by administration or social security services with 15.33%, and trade and retail sector with 14.67%. The city's gross regional product in 2021 was valued at 1.12 trillion rupiah with an annual economic growth of 5.82% on 2019 before the  COVID-19 pandemic. The economy of the city shrank 1.29% in 2020 due to the pandemic before it bounced back again in 2021 with growth of 2.67. The fastest growing sectors in the city in 2021 include the healthcare sector with an annual growth of 9.25% and the transportation sector with an annual growth of 8.13%. In terms of size, the city has the smallest economy in Aceh when compared to other cities and regencies in the province.

Infrastructure

Transport 
Sabang is served by Maimun Saleh Airport. The airport is located southeast of the central city on Weh Island and is capable of handling ATR 72 aircraft. The airport has flights to Kualanamu International Airport in Medan. The airport is also a military base for the Indonesian Air Force and also has been proposed to be an international airport.

Sabang has a deep sea port which is important to the trade in the region. India and Indonesia are jointly developing the Sabang deep sea port which also lies close to India's southernmost territory of Andaman and Nicobar Islands. In 2002, Indian Navy and Indonesian Navy signed an "Ind-Indo Corpat" agreement. Indian naval ships have been regularly visiting Sabang port following the signing of this agreement. Indonesia's minister for maritime affairs, Luhut Pandjaitan, stated that Indonesia has given economic and military access by India to the strategic Sabang port; India will invest in the port and economic zone of Sabang city. Pelni, state-owned shipping company, is serving the city through Sea Toll Program which is highly subsidized to nearby cities such as Lhokseumawe, Banda Aceh, and Medan.

The city has a total of 144.75 kilometers of road, all of which have been paved with asphalt as of 2022. The city, unlike most of places in Indonesia, does not have any presence of angkot, and the presence of public transportation inside the city is minimal. Online ride-hailing service such as those by Gojek are present in the city.

Education 
The city in 2022 has a total of 20 kindergartens, 30 elementary schools, 11 junior high schools, and 4 senior high schools, in addition of one vocational high school. There are also two higher education institutions in the city, Al-Aziziyah Sabang Sharia College and Ibnu Sina Nursery Academy. Both of these institutions are private. The literacy rate in the city is relatively high at 99.76% in 2020.

References

External links 

  Official Sabang City

 
Populated places in Aceh
Cities in Indonesia